1st Tsvetovo or Pervoye Tsvetovo is a rural locality and the administrative center of Novoposelenovsky Selsoviet Rural Settlement, Kursky District, Kursk Oblast, Russia. Population:

Geography 
The village is located 81 km from the Russia–Ukraine border, 11 km south-west of Kursk.

 Streets
There are the following streets in the locality: Belgorodsky kvartal, Dachny proyezd, Lugovaya, Novaya, Polevaya, Pridorozhnaya, Sovetskaya, Stepnaya, Shkolnaya, Yunosti and Zarechnaya (418 houses).

 Climate
1st Tsvetovo has a warm-summer humid continental climate (Dfb in the Köppen climate classification).

Transport 
1st Tsvetovo is located on the federal route  Crimea Highway (an access road to Kursk, part of the European route ), on the road of intermunicipal significance  ("Crimea Highway" – 1st Tsvetovo – Novoposelenovka), 3.5 km from the nearest railway station Ryshkovo (railway line Lgov I — Kursk).

The rural locality is situated 19 km from Kursk Vostochny Airport, 114 km from Belgorod International Airport and 217 km from Voronezh Peter the Great Airport.

References

Notes

Sources

Rural localities in Kursky District, Kursk Oblast